Feofil Matveyevich Tolstoy (6 June 1809, Saint Petersburg, Imperial Russia, — 20 February 1881, Saint Petersburg, Imperial Russia), was a Russian composer, music critic and writer who used the pseudonym Rostislav.

Tolstoy, the son of the senator Matvey Fyodorovich Tolstoy (1772—1815) and Praskovya Mikhaylovna Kutuzova (1777—1844), the daughter of the renowned Russian Field marshal Mikhail Kutuzov, worked for the most of his life as a mid-rank level state official, linked to the Moscow and Smolensk governors' offices, as well as the Ministry of Defense. He authored more than 200 romances (including the earliest, 1829, adaptation of Pushkin's "Ya vas lyubil...", "I Loved You"), as well as two operas. The first, Birichino di Parigi (with an Italian libretto), was produced in Naples, Italy, in 1832 and in Saint Petersburg in 1835. The second, Doktor v khlopotakh (Доктор в хлопотах, Doctor in Business) was staged in 1851 in Russia.

Disillusioned with the response, Tolstoy embarked upon the career of a music critic and, contributing to Severnaya Ptchela, Golos, Moskovskiye Vedomosti and Journal de St. Petersbourg earned himself a reputation of an authority, mostly on Mikhail Glinka, Alexander Dargomyzhsky and Alexander Serov.<ref> Александр Николаевич Серов. 1820—1871. Memoirs of F.M. Tolstoy //  Воспоминания Ф. М. Толстого / Russkaya Starina, 1874. Vol. 9. No. 2, pp. 323—380.]</ref> Tolstoy wrote two short novels, Kapitan Toldi (Капитан Тольди, Sovremennik, 1852) and Bolezni voli (Болезни воли, Ailments of the Will, Russky Vestnik'', 1859).

Alexandra Davydova (1815—1884), a well-known opera singer and a popular art salon hostess, was his wife.

References

External links
The Works by Feofil Toilstoy at lib.ru

Musicians from Saint Petersburg
Russian male composers
Russian music critics
Writers from Saint Petersburg
Feofil
1809 births
1881 deaths
Burials at Nikolskoe Cemetery
19th-century male musicians